Shirabad (also Romanized as Shīrābād; also known as Shahrābād, Shahrābād Kord, Shīrābād-e Soflá, and Zū-ye Soflá) is a village in Howmeh Rural District, in the Central District of Maneh and Samalqan County, North Khorasan Province, Iran. At the 2006 census, its population was 774, in 204 families.

References 

Populated places in Maneh and Samalqan County